Georges Floquet (20 July 1920 – 21 June 2007) was a French gymnast. He competed in eight events at the 1952 Summer Olympics.

References

External links
 

1920 births
2007 deaths
French male artistic gymnasts
Olympic gymnasts of France
Gymnasts at the 1952 Summer Olympics
Place of birth missing
20th-century French people